Alopecosa pictilis is a species of wolf spider in the family Lycosidae. It is found in North America and Russia (Sibiria).

References

pictilis
Articles created by Qbugbot
Spiders described in 1885